Events in the year 1948 in Venezuela

Incumbents
President: Revolutionary Junta until February 15, Rómulo Gallegos after February 15 until November 24, Military Junta after November 24

Events
November 24: 1948 Venezuelan coup d'état

Births
 19 July – Adita Riera, actress, announcer, and model

Deaths

 
1940s in Venezuela
Years of the 20th century in Venezuela
Venezuela
Venezuela